The black-bellied starling (Notopholia corusca) is a species of starling in the family Sturnidae. It is found in Eswatini, Kenya, Mozambique, Somalia, South Africa, Tanzania, and Zimbabwe.

References

External links

Black-bellied (glossy) starling - Species text in The Atlas of Southern African Birds

black-bellied starling
Birds of East Africa
black-bellied starling
black-bellied starling
Taxonomy articles created by Polbot